Arvière-en-Valromey is a commune in the Ain department in eastern France. The municipality was established on 1 January 2019 by merger of the former communes of Brénaz, Chavornay, Lochieu and Virieu-le-Petit.

Geography

Climate
Arvière-en-Valromey has a oceanic climate (Köppen climate classification Cfb).

See also
Communes of the Ain department

References

Communes of Ain
Communes nouvelles of Ain
Ain communes articles needing translation from French Wikipedia
Populated places established in 2019
2019 establishments in France